Endotricha nicobaralis is a species of snout moth in the genus Endotricha. It is found in the Nicobar Islands, Burma and China (Hainan).

References

Moths described in 1906
Endotrichini